Connie Sawyer (born Rosie Cohen; November 27, 1912 – January 21, 2018) was an American stage, film, and television actress, affectionately nicknamed "The Clown Princess of Comedy". She had over 140 film and television credits to her name, but was best known for her appearances in Pineapple Express, Dumb and Dumber, and When Harry Met Sally.... At the time of her death at age 105, she was the oldest working actress in Hollywood, with a career spanning an impressive 85 years, and was the oldest member of the Screen Actors Guild and the Academy of Motion Picture Arts and Sciences.

Early life
Connie Sawyer was born as Rosie Cohen on November 27, 1912 in Pueblo, Colorado, to Orthodox Jewish parents. Her father, Samuel Cohen, was an immigrant from Romania, and her mother, Dora Inger, also from Romania, had been living in Denver, Colorado, until their marriage. Both of her parents came from the same village in Romania, but her mother arrived first in the United States. When she was 7, the family moved to Oakland, California, where her father opened an army-navy store.

Professional career
Sawyer's mother loved showbusiness and encouraged Sawyer to learn singing and dancing, and entered her into talent competitions as a child. In her first competition, a song and dance routine, at the age of 8, she won third prize and was given a stack of pies. She attended Roosevelt High School in Oakland and was the first woman to be senior class president. Following graduation, Sawyer won a radio contest (first place this time) which came with a chance to perform on a radio variety show in San Francisco titled “Al Pearce and His Gang,” a show which gave her the opportunity to develop her own comedy routine.

At the age of 19, Sawyer moved to New York and performed in nightclubs and vaudeville theaters. Sawyer and a few friends worked their way across the country (literally), staying in each city along the way and performing for several weeks. Once in New York she met Sophie Tucker, who connected Sawyer with a comedy writer, and she began to travel with her show. In the 1950s she began to appear on television, including The Milton Berle Show and The Jackie Gleason Show.

In the late 1950s, agent Lillian Small, who worked for Frank Sinatra, saw Sawyer in the Broadway show A Hole in the Head, playing "Miss Wexler". Sinatra later optioned the rights for a film version and hired Sawyer to reprise her role in the 1959 film production, which starred Sinatra, Edward G. Robinson, and Eleanor Parker. Sawyer continued to appear regularly on television, in such series as The Mary Tyler Moore Show, Laverne & Shirley, The Rockford Files, Hawaii Five-O, Dynasty, Murder, She Wrote, Home Improvement, Seinfeld, Boy Meets World, Will & Grace, Welcome Back, Kotter, ER, How I Met Your Mother, and Ray Donovan. In 2007, Sawyer appeared in the HBO series Tell Me You Love Me with Jane Alexander; however, Sawyer, later expressed regret as she considered the show to be pornographic. In 2012, the year of her centenary, she appeared on 2 Broke Girls, and, in recognition of her birthday, she was a guest on The Tonight Show with Jay Leno. Past 100 years of age, she appeared on television in NCIS: Los Angeles (2013), and, opposite Zooey Deschanel, in New Girl (2014), as "the Oldest Woman in the World". In 2014, she also appeared in two films: Lovesick and the short film Entanglement.

Autobiography
Sawyer self-published (in September 2017) an autobiography, ''I Never Wanted to Be a Star — and I Wasn't, describing her life in Hollywood.

Later life
For 12 years, Sawyer lived at the Motion Picture & Television Fund’s residential complex for entertainment industry retirees in Los Angeles, where she remained an active member of the Academy of Motion Picture Arts and Sciences, continuing to watch all Oscar-nominated films before placing her votes each year.

Personal life 
Sawyer was married to film distributor Marshall Schacker for ten years, later separating. They had two daughters together, Lisa and Julie.

Sawyer suffered a heart attack and later died at her home at the Motion Picture & Television Fund’s retirement community in Woodland Hills, California on January 21, 2018, aged 105.

Filmography

See also
 List of centenarians (actors, filmmakers and entertainers)

References

Becker (TV series)

External links
 
 
Connie Sawyer at Find a Grave
 Connie Sawyer (Aveleyman)

1912 births
2018 deaths
American film actresses
American television actresses
American centenarians
Actresses from Colorado
Jewish American actresses
20th-century American actresses
21st-century American actresses
American people of Romanian-Jewish descent
Actresses from Oakland, California
People from Pueblo, Colorado
Burials at Hillside Memorial Park Cemetery
Women centenarians
21st-century American Jews